Charles Dundas may refer to:

 Charles Dundas, 1st Baron Amesbury (1751–1832), British politician
 Charles Lawrence Dundas (1761–1810), MP for Malton
 Charles Whitley Deans Dundas (1811–1856), Member of Parliament (MP) for Flint 1837–1841
 Charles Saunders Dundas, 6th Viscount Melville (1843–1926), Viscount Melville
 Charles Dundas (naval officer) (1859–1924), "of Dundas", Royal Navy rear-admiral, grandfather of Charles Jauncey, Baron Jauncey of Tullichettle
 Charles Dundas (governor) (1884–1956), British colonial governor
 Charles Dundas (priest) (1847–1932), Anglican priest